The Book Club Companion is a book written by Westport, Connecticut resident Diana Loevy, with the focus on book clubs and what they are made of.  The purpose of this book is to share people's love for books and to strengthen friendships in that way.  

The author is an active book club participant and her experiences with such groups is mentioned in the book.

External links
 The Book Club Companion on Amazon.com

Book promotion
Book clubs